Cooking Vinyl Australia is an independent record label based in Melbourne, Australia. Founded in 2013 by co-managing directors Leigh Gruppetta and Stu Harvey in partnership with Martin Goldschmidt, Cooking Vinyl Australia boasts a diverse roster of artists and works with a variety of international and domestic label partners.

Australian artists and bands signed directly to Cooking Vinyl Australia include Ceres, Eliza & The Delusionals, Emma Donovan, Fanny Lumsden, High Tension, Johnny Hunter, King Stingray, Luca Brasi, STUMPS, Tyler Richardson and Windwaker.

History

After working together at Shock records, Leigh Gruppetta and Stu Harvey founded Cooking Vinyl Australia in 2013, in a partnership with Martin Goldschmidt, the London-based Cooking Vinyl Group Founder & CEO.

In 2016, Cooking Vinyl Australia launched a music publishing division based in Sydney, Australia. Reporting directly to Goldschmidt, Cooking Vinyl Publishing is a standalone company overseen by Matthew Donlevy, the former managing director of Peermusic.

In 2018, Cooking Vinyl Australia partnered with Sony Music Australia with Sony making "a significant investment" in the Indie label. As part of the arrangement, Cooking Vinyl Australia's recordings would be distributed globally through Sony's distributor and label services company The Orchard. “We are thrilled about what the future holds as we enter this next phase of the business" - Leigh Gruppetta, The Music Network, 2018 

In November 2022, Cooking Vinyl Australia signed Melbourne/Naarm based band CIVIC, announcing the release of their forthcoming album Taken By Force, set for release February 2023.

Label Partners 
Cooking Vinyl Australia works with a variety of international and domestic label partners to release and promote music in Australia and New Zealand. These include:

 Bargain Bin
 Cooking Vinyl UK
 Dine Alone Records 
 Greyscale Records
 Resist Records
 Run For Cover Records 
 SideOneDummy Records 
 Triple Crown Records 
 Thirty Tigers

Artists

Current

 Baroness
 Ceres
 CIVIC
 Eliza & The Delusionals
 Emma Donovan & The Putbacks
 Fanny Lumsden
 High Tension
 Jenny Mitchell
 Johnny Hunter

 King Stingray
 Luca Brasi
 Parkway Drive
 PUP
 Sarah Wolfe
 STUMPS
 Tyler Richardson
 Windwaker

Past

 Boydos
 Calling All Cars
 Elizabeth Fader
 Endless Heights
 Ivan Ooze
 Kate Miller-Heidke
 Mike Noga
 The Chats
 Tracy McNeil & The Goodlife

Awards and nominations

AIR Awards
The Australian Independent Record Awards (commonly known informally as AIR Awards) is an annual awards night to recognise, promote and celebrate the success of Australia's Independent Music sector.

! 
|-
| 2022
| King Stingray Get Me Out
| Independent Song of the Year
| 
| 
|-
| 2022
| Emma Donovan & The Putbacks Under These Streets
| Best Independent Soul/R&B Album or EP
| 
| 
|-
|rowspan="2"| 2021
|rowspan="2"| Emma Donovan Crossover
| Independent Album of the Year
| 
|rowspan="2"| 
|-
| Best Independent Soul/R&B Album or EP
| 
|-
|rowspan="2"| 2021
|rowspan="2"| Fanny Lumsden Fallow
| Independent Album of the Year
| 
|rowspan="2"| 
|-
| Best Independent Country Album or EP
| 
|-
| 2021
| Parkway Drive Viva the Underdogs
| Best Independent Heavy Album or EP
| 
| 
|-
| 2019
| High Tension Purge
| Best Independent Hard Rock, Heavy or Punk Album
| 
|-
| 2018 || Fanny Lumsden Real Class Act || Best Country Album ||  || 
|-
| 2017
| Luca Brasi If This Is All We're Going to Be
| Best Independent Hard Rock, Heavy or Punk Album
| 
|
|-
| 2013
| Parkway Drive Atlas 
| rowspan="2"| Best Independent Hard Rock or Punk Album
| 
| 
|-
| 2010
| Parkway Drive Deep Blue 
| 
|

See also 

 Cooking Vinyl UK - (UK, 1886 - ); founded by former manager and booking agent Martin Goldschmidt and business partner Pete Lawrence in Acton, London, England in 1986.
 List of record labels
 Sony Music Australia - (Australia, 2004 - ); operated by American parent company Sony Music Entertainment
 The Orchard - (USA, 1997 - ); founded by Scott Cohen and Richard Gottehrer in New York City. A subsidiary of Sony Music, the company specialises in media distribution, marketing and sales across music and entertainment.

References 

Australian record labels
Record labels based in Melbourne